"Just Another Saturday" is the 15th episode of fifth season of the British BBC anthology TV series Play for Today. The episode was a television play that was originally broadcast on 13 March 1975.. "Just Another Saturday" was written by Peter McDougall, directed by John Mackenzie, produced by Graeme MacDonald, and starred Jon Morrison and Billy Connolly.

"Just Another Saturday" is about the Orange walk culture. The episode won the Prix Italia for Best Drama.

Synopsis 
John looks forward with nervous excitement to the annual Orange order march in Glasgow, in which he will lead his local Orange Lodge band as mace-swinger. However, as the day progresses he begins to become disillusioned with the day and his colleagues, as he witnesses their growing drunkenness and unwarranted violence against Catholic homes on the march's route. Events of the day lead him to question his involvement with the band, which also threatens his own safety.

Cast
 Jon Morrison as John
 Eileen McCallum as Lizzie
 Bill Henderson as Dan
 Ken Hutchison as Rab
 Billy Connolly as Paddy
 Jim Gibb as Jim
 Phil McCall as Joe
 Jake D'Arcy as Jackie
 James Walsh as Tommy
 Martin Black as Man in Fight

Critical reception
The BFI's Screenonline website comments: "Beyond the political issues, it is McDougall's mastery not only of the gallows humour of Glasgow's working class but of the hidden motives of parental kindness that make the drama, in Jeremy Isaacs's words, "a masterpiece" and won the play the Prix Italia."

References

External links
 

1975 British television episodes
1975 television plays
British television plays
Glasgow in fiction
Orange Order
Play for Today
Prix Italia winners
Sectarianism
Films directed by John Mackenzie (film director)